Stuart Alexander may refer to:

Stuart Alexander (murderer) (1961–2005), American businessman convicted of murder
Stuart Alexander (politician), see Robertson ministry
Stuart Alexander & Co Pty Ltd, an Australasian company founded in 1884

See also

Stewart Alexander (disambiguation)
Alexander Stuart (disambiguation)